The Kingsley–Pierson Community School District is a rural public school district headquartered in Kingsley, Iowa.

It includes sections of Plymouth, Cherokee, and Woodbury counties. It serves Kingsley, Pierson, and the surrounding rural areas.

History

It was established in 1961, by the consolidation of the Kingsley and Pierson districts.

Schools
The district operates four schools:
 Kingsley Elementary School, Kingsley
 Pierson Elementary School, Pierson
 Pierson Middle School, Pierson
 Kingsley–Pierson High School, Kingsley

Kingsley–Pierson High School

Athletics
The Panthers compete in the Western Valley Activities Conference in the following sports:
Cross country
Volleyball
Football
Basketball
Wrestling
Track and field
 Boys' 2-time state champions (1978, 2017)
Golf
 Boys' 1987 class 1A state champions
Baseball
Softball
 3-time state champions (1966, (summer), 1966 (fall), 1967 (fall))

See also
List of school districts in Iowa
List of high schools in Iowa

References

External links
 Kingsley–Pierson Community School District

School districts in Iowa
1961 establishments in Iowa
School districts established in 1961
Education in Cherokee County, Iowa
Education in Plymouth County, Iowa
Education in Woodbury County, Iowa